Petros Triantafyllidis (born 5 June 1971) is a Greek wrestler. He competed in the men's Greco-Roman 74 kg at the 1992 Summer Olympics. His father also competed at the Olympics.

References

External links
 

1971 births
Living people
Greek male sport wrestlers
Olympic wrestlers of Greece
Wrestlers at the 1992 Summer Olympics
Sportspeople from Thessaloniki
20th-century Greek people